Gravelyzomus is a monotypic genus of hubbardiid short-tailed whipscorpions, first described by Mandar Kulkarni in 2012. Its single species, Gravelyzomus chalakudicus is distributed in India.

References 

Schizomida genera
Monotypic arachnid genera